List winners of Czech Republic championship in English draughts.

References 
 List Checkers/Draughts champions of the Czech Republic

Draughts competitions